Orectoderus is a genus of plant bugs in the family Miridae. There are about 10 described species in Orectoderus.

Species
These 10 species belong to the genus Orectoderus:
 Orectoderus arcuatus Knight, 1927
 Orectoderus bakeri Knight, 1968
 Orectoderus cockerelli Knight, 1968
 Orectoderus longicollis Uhler, 1895
 Orectoderus montanus Knight, 1968
 Orectoderus obliquus Uhler, 1876
 Orectoderus ruckesi Knight, 1968
 Orectoderus salicis Knight, 1968
 Orectoderus schuhi Knight, 1964
 Orectoderus utahensis Knight, 1968

References

Further reading

 
 
 

Phylinae
Articles created by Qbugbot